Thrikkannamangal is a village in the tehsil of Kottarakara in the Kollam District of Kerala, India.

Etymology
This town is named so because it was the direction that the Kings of old, standing in their palace, would face in the morning .  A city in Kerala is named Kottarakara because it served as a place for the kings' "kottaram," or palace.  It has people of many faiths and political leanings.

Demographics
There is a strong Hindu and Christian presence.  Although significant, the Muslim population is not as large as the Hindu or Christian population ..  Supporters of the Congress and Communist parties dominate politics in the area.

Educational institutions
 S K V High School
 Govt LPGS
 CVNMLP ( Kalloor School)
Panorama College
Novel Tuition Centre
 Carmel Residential Senior Secondary School, Kadavila

Kathakali
Thrikkannamangal has its own Kathakali Museum, which is situated in Thottam Junction. Kathakali is a dance form that originated in Kerala .

Pentacost Movement
One of the unique points of modern history tied to Thrikkannamangal is that it served as the launching pad for the Pentecostal movement that has now spread throughout India. American independent missionary George E. Berg received baptism of Spirit at Azusa street mission in 1908. He came to Thrikkannamangal along with other missionaries during 1909 and proclaimed the first Pentecostal message in the 20th century. Due to the objection of co-missionaries he came during the year 1910 and 1911 along with native missionary Cummins of an Anglo Indian and preached petecoatal message. All these conventions are facilitated by Kalloor family especially Kalloor Chacko one of the patriarches of the family. George E. Berg brought Robert Cook to Bangalore during 1913. The American missionary, Robert F. Cook, was received into Kottarakara by the late Kalloor Chacko, the patriarchs of the Kalloor family in Kottarakara during 1921. The name of the first Pentecostal church established by Cook at Thrikkannamangal was named as Malankara poorna suveseha Sabha and now it is known as Malankara Church of God, Thrikkannamngal. This is the first Pentecostal Church in Thrikkannamngal. Beginning his work in Thrikkannamangal, Cook later moved to Mulakuzha and established the headquarters of the Indian Pentecostal Church of God there.  The founders of the India Pentecostal Church as well as many other Pentecostal organizations were co-workers with Cook in the early days, parted him and formed separate Churches for political or doctrinal reasons.  The oldest registered Pentecostal church in India is located in Thrikkannamangal. Gandhinagar is a part of Thrikkannamangal which is a beautiful agricultural place ..

Places for Worship
SREE KRISHNA SWAMI TEMPLE:

The idol of Mahavishnu is erected facing westward and ‘Garuda’ facing it from the opposite. The kulashyva Brahmins settled here following the tussle between the Elayidath dynasty and Ettyapuram Lords. At present it is under the Thiruvithamkoor Devasom Board taken from the Kadalaymana Thampurans who owned a number of temples.
The NagaRaja idol of this temple is famous. The Ayilya puja in the month of ‘Kanni’ attracts thousands of devotees. All the usual ceremonial rites are also offered at the doors of temples of Mahaganapathi, Mahadevar, Manikandaswami, Mada swami.

The festival of this temple is celebrated on the ‘Utram’ in the month of ‘Medam’. The peculiar practice of offering food of the deity is also famous. The other special offerings are payasam, Unniyappam and Noorum Palum. The first fruit is also offered.

Bethel AG CHURCH:

Thrikannamangal is one of the earliest places where the true Pentecostal experience as a result of the overflowing power of Holy Spirit that was spreading all over the world was proclaimed.

Rev. George Berg  accompanied some foreign missionaries to the 1909 conventions and preached about the power of the Holy Spirit which he had received at United States. 

Fascinated by the Pentecostal truths, Pallikkizhakkethil Luckose ,  Anazhikath Mathaichan ,  Kochukkizhakkethil Kuttiyachan,  Ammankotte Chacko Yohannan , and  Kizhakevila Panavela House  Chackochan bought some land and built a small shed for worship.

This is what later became the Assemblies of God shrine. 

As the Fellowship progressed, the Assemblies of God Church was established in 1927, in collaboration with some of the brethren as a result of the continuous work of Rev. George Budges Saip and Sir Kundara Panicker. 

Thrikkannamangal AG Church is one of the earliest churches of the Assemblies of God.

IPC REHOBOTH CHURCH:

The Indian Pentecostal Church of God, Thrikkanamangal; a highly active fellowship of churches

ST GEORGE ORTHODOX CHURCH(THATTATHUPALLY)

SALEM MARTHOMA CHURCH 
it is one of the oldest church. During the evangelical movement, church split and evangelical church established. Marthoma vision changed the face of village.
During the initial stage poikayil family played a very important role as it is known as poikayil pally in the olden days especially before the church is undertaken by concerned authorities.

St.Antony's malankara catholic church, thottammukku, thrikkannamangal is the only Catholic church in the area and was constructed on land granted by Anazhikathu Gheevarghese and Vadakkadathu Thomas.

References

External links
Ganapathy Temple
 IPC Rehoboth Church Thrikkannamangal
 Government of Kerala

Villages in Kollam district